Brodies LLP is a Scottish law firm.

The firm offers legal advice to private and public sector clients both in the UK and internationally in its core business areas of corporate and commercial; energy (both renewables and oil & gas); real estate; litigation and dispute resolution; banking and financial services; employment, pensions and benefits, trust and tax, and personal and family law.

Financial performance

In July 2019, Brodies LLP reported that in its financial year to 30 April, revenues grew by 12% to a record £76.86 million. Over the same period, profits before partner distributions rose by 14% to £37.4 million and the firm’s cash balances increased to £21.8 million.

Awards
Scotland Law Firm of the Year at the Who’s Who Legal Awards 2019
Legal 500 Scotland Regional Firm of the Year 2018
UK National/Regional Law Firm of the Year at the Legal Business Awards 2017
Legal Advisor of the Year at the Business Insider Deals and Dealmakers Awards 2017
UK Regional Law Firm of the Year at the Lawyer Awards 2016
UK Law Firm of the Year 2014, British Legal Awards

List of chairmen (from 2004)
 2004-2013 Joyce Cullen
 2013- Christine O'Neill

List of managing partners (from 1997)
 1997-2018 Bill Drummond
 2018- Nick Scott

External links
 Brodies Website

References

Law firms of Scotland
Companies based in Edinburgh